Kevin Dennis Kurányi Rodríguez (born 2 March 1982) is a German former professional footballer. He played as a striker and possessed great aerial ability and finishing skills. From 2003 to 2008, Kurányi was part of the German national team, for which he scored 19 goals in 52 games. He participated in two UEFA Euro and one Confederations Cup.

Early life
Kurányi was born in Rio de Janeiro, Brazil, to a German father of Hungarian descent and a Panamanian mother. He eventually opted to play for the German national team after being also qualified to play for Brazil, Panama or Hungary.

Club career

Early career
Kurányi began playing football in 1988 for Petrópolis-based Serrano FC in Brazil, when he was six years old. In 1993, he transferred to Panamanian club Las Promesas, where he played for one year before going back to Serrano FC. Kurányi returned to Las Promesas in 1996 for a further year.

VfB Stuttgart
In 1997, Kurányi moved to Germany, enlisting at VfB Stuttgart's B youth team. After playing a few games in the Germany national under-21 football team, he signed his first professional contract for VfB in 2001.

Following on from his 33 matches and 10 goals for the amateur team, Kurányi played 99 matches for VfB Stuttgart's professional team, scoring 40 goals. He also took part in 22 European team championship games, scoring 10 goals. In the 2002–03 season of the Bundesliga, he was the top German goal-scorer and one of the main reasons for Stuttgart's second-place finish in the league. That year, VfB and its "Junge Wilde" ("young wild ones"), comprising Timo Hildebrand, Andreas Hinkel, Alexander Hleb, Philipp Lahm, Imre Szabics and Kurányi, delighted Stuttgart fans with superb attacking football.

Schalke 04
Kurányi left Stuttgart during the 2005 summer transfer window to join Schalke, signing to 2009–10. At Gelsenkirchen, he finished top goalscorer for the team from 2005–08, while the team achieved three consecutive UEFA Champions League berths.

On 15 April 2008, Kurányi scored four goals in Schalke's 5–0 win over Energie Cottbus in a league match, the other being an own goal. Three days earlier, incidentally, Schalke were beaten 5–1 at Werder Bremen, with Kurányi also netting.

Dynamo Moscow
On 9 May 2010, it was announced that Kurányi would move to Dynamo Moscow on 1 July 2010 and signed a three-year contract. After renewing his contract with Dynamo until 2015, he became captain of the team in July 2012. He netted two goals for Dynamo on 9 December 2012, to lift the capital club to a 2–1 victory over Terek Grozny.

1899 Hoffenheim
After his contract with Dynamo expired in the summer of 2015, Kurányi returned to Germany and signed for 1899 Hoffenheim on 24 July 2015, on a one-year deal.

Kurányi announced his retirement on 24 March 2017.

International career
Kurányi made his debut for Germany during the Euro 2004 qualifier against Lithuania on 29 March 2003. In his sixth appearance, the young striker netted Germany's final qualifying goal in their 3–0 defeat of Iceland. He played for his adopted country at the tournament's finals and at the 2005 Confederations Cup but was not selected for the 2006 World Cup in Germany.

In 2006–07, Kurányi regained his touch and after an absence of 15 months, he was recalled to the national team, scoring during Germany's 3–1 win against Switzerland on 7 February 2007, in a friendly in Düsseldorf. In Germany's Euro 2008 qualifying match against the Czech Republic on 24 March, he scored both goals in the 2–1 victory. He was brought on during the second half of the Euro 2008 final against Spain for Thomas Hitzlsperger, but was unable to score in the 0–1 loss, receiving a yellow card in the process. Incidentally, the appearance in the final marked his 50th cap for Germany.

On 11 October 2008, Kurányi was left out of the 18-man squad to face Russia. After watching the first half from the stands with other unselected players, he left the stadium during the half-time interval and failed to return to the German team hotel. After this incident, German team coach Joachim Löw said that he would never again select Kurányi for the national team. One of his advisors said of the incident to reporters "He decided what he for himself found to be right, which was to say I'm going home."

Personal life
Due to his mixed descent, Kurányi holds German, Panamanian and Brazilian citizenships. Kurányi has stated that he is an avid supporter of his favorite team, Brazilian side Flamengo.

Career statistics

Club

International

International goals

Honours
VfB Stuttgart
UEFA Intertoto Cup: 2002

Schalke 04
DFL-Ligapokal: 2005
Germany
FIFA Confederations Cup third place: 2005
UEFA European Championship runner-up: 2008
Individual
kicker Bundesliga Team of the Season: 2006–07, 2009–10

References

External links

  
 
 
 

1982 births
Living people
Footballers from Rio de Janeiro (city)
Brazilian people of German descent
Brazilian people of Hungarian descent
Brazilian people of Panamanian descent
German people of Hungarian descent
German people of Panamanian descent
German people of Brazilian descent
Panamanian people of German descent
Panamanian people of Brazilian descent
Association football forwards
Brazilian footballers
German footballers
Brazilian emigrants to Germany
Citizens of Germany through descent
Brazilian expatriate footballers
German expatriate footballers
Expatriate footballers in Russia
Expatriate footballers in Panama
Brazilian expatriate sportspeople in Russia
German expatriate sportspeople in Russia
Bundesliga players
Russian Premier League players
Serrano Football Club players
VfB Stuttgart players
VfB Stuttgart II players
FC Schalke 04 players
FC Dynamo Moscow players
TSG 1899 Hoffenheim players
Germany international footballers
Germany B international footballers
Germany under-21 international footballers
UEFA Euro 2004 players
2005 FIFA Confederations Cup players
UEFA Euro 2008 players